Neofriseria caucasicella is a moth of the family Gelechiidae. It is found in the Caucasus and Moldavia. Records from Ukraine are based on misidentifications.

The larvae feed on Rumex species.

References

Moths described in 1960
Neofriseria